Nicholas Van Dyke (December 20, 1769 – May 21, 1826) was an American lawyer and politician from New Castle, Delaware. He was a member of the Federalist Party, who served in the Delaware General Assembly, as Attorney General of Delaware, as U.S. Representative from Delaware, and as U.S. senator from Delaware.

Early life and family
Van Dyke was born in New Castle, Delaware, son of Nicholas and Charlotte Stanley Van Dyke. His father had been a member of the Continental Congress and a President of Delaware. The younger Nicholas graduated from the College of New Jersey, now Princeton University in 1788, studied law with his brother-in-law, Kensy Johns, and was admitted to the Delaware Bar in New Castle, in 1792. He married Mary Ann Leuvaneigh in 1792. They had six children, including Nicholas III, Kensey Johns, and Dorcas Montgomery and lived at many houses in and around New Castle. One of these was at the corner of Delaware and Fourth Streets and was the location of the 1824 wedding of Dorcas Van Dyke and Charles I. du Pont, which was attended by the Marquis de Lafayette. His farm and summer retreat, The Hermitage, was added to the National Register of Historic Places in 1973. The family were members of Immanuel Episcopal Church.

Political career
Van Dyke was a Federalist who was a member of the Delaware House of Representatives in 1799. From 1801 until 1806 he served as Delaware Attorney General. In 1807 he was elected to the 10th United States Congress to fill the vacancy caused by the resignation of U.S. Representative James M. Broom. He was reelected to the 11th Congress, and served in the U.S. House from October 6, 1807, until March 3, 1811. With the Federalists a powerless minority in Congress, he returned home to serve as the Attorney General of Delaware. Subsequently, he was elected to the Delaware State Senate for the 1816 and 1817 sessions. While serving there he was elected to the United States Senate and served from March 4, 1817, until his death on May 21, 1826.  He missed the first month and a half of the 18th Congress, as his first term in the Senate expired on March 3, 1823, and he was not re-elected by the Delaware Legislature until January 7, 1824. He did not take his seat in the Senate for the 18th Congress until January 14, 1824, while the Senate had convened on December 1, 1823. He was Chairman of the Committee on Pensions in the 16th U.S. Congress.

Death and legacy
Van Dyke died at New Castle, and is buried there in the Immanuel Episcopal Church Cemetery. A fellow lawyer who knew Van Dyke compared him to other lawyers by saying that he was a "sound lawyer and superior to them all as a fluent, graceful and successful advocate and in the skillful management of his cases."

Almanac
Elections were held the first Tuesday of October and members of the General Assembly took office on the first Tuesday of January. The State Senate had a term of three years and the State House had a term of one year. U.S. Representatives took office March 4 and had a two-year term. The General Assembly chose the U.S. senators who also took office March 4, but for a six-year term.

See also
List of United States Congress members who died in office (1790–1899)

Notes

References

 https://www.familysearch.org/ark:/61903/1:1:QVV3-Q7J6?from=lynx1UIV8&treeref=LCMN-W9B

External links
Biographical Dictionary of the United States
Delaware’s Members of Congress

The Political Graveyard

1769 births
1826 deaths
People from New Castle, Delaware
People of colonial Delaware
American people of Dutch descent
Federalist Party members of the United States House of Representatives from Delaware
Federalist Party United States senators from Delaware
National Republican Party United States senators from Delaware
Delaware National Republicans
Delaware Attorneys General
Delaware lawyers
Princeton University alumni
Burials in New Castle County, Delaware
19th-century American lawyers
19th-century American Episcopalians